David Blunt may refer to:

David Blunt (born 1949), English footballer
David Blunt, 12th Baronet (born 1938) of the Blunt baronets
David Blunt, List of ambassadors of the United Kingdom to Croatia

See also
David Blount (born 1967), American senator
Blunt (surname)